Mizan Teferi Airport  is an airport in Mizan Teferi, Ethiopia.

References

Airports in Ethiopia
Southern Nations, Nationalities, and Peoples' Region